Sphaerophoria  is a genus of hoverflies.
Species slender 5.6-12mm long with extremely large hemispherical male terminalia after which the common name globetales has been created. (see gallery)  There are bright yellow markings on head and thorax and usually on abdomen but some species with black abdomen. 
They can be found worldwide but are common in North America, Europe, Asia and Australia. There are over 73 described species.

The larvae when known are aphidophagous.

Diagnostics 
For terminology seeSpeight key to genera and glossary
The male has a yellow frons, rarely with a pair of black spots above the antennae, while the female has a median black stripe. The face is usually yellow, often with black markings, and has a prominent tubercle that only recedes slightly to the lower facial margin. The eyes are bare. The scutum is glossy black with a wide yellow stripe that either terminates at the transverse suture or extends to the scutellum.  The pleura has black coloring with bright yellow patterns. The anterior anepisternum is bare. The upper and lower katepisternal hair patches are distinct from each other, with the former usually extending ventrally in a triangular shape about three-quarters of the distance from the upper to lower margin of the sclerite. The meron and metapleuron are both devoid of hair, and the metasternum has some. There are small bare areas on the basal one-third of the wing membrane.
Males have an abdomen is that is slender, unmargined, and parallel-sided or slightly constricted near the middle. The fifth segment on the right side has a bluntly rounded posterior extension.  Females have an abdomen that is parallel or slightly widened in the middle.

Male genitalia 
The epandrium is typically very large, almost as wide as segment 5 and usually slightly longer than wide, with the posterior being slightly wider. The cerci are usually enclosed in a sclerotized layer of the epandrium. The surstylus is usually detailed and divided into three lobes. The dorsal lobe is slightly swollen at the top, round, and has a thick mass of long, coarse yellow hairs. The ventral lobe is flattened, sometimes elongate, and often split into two parts at the tip, with sparsely-haired but a densely setulose longitudinal ridge on its inner side.

Species

Subgenus Exallandra
 Sphaerophoria cinctifacies (Speiser, 1910)
 Sphaerophoria loewii Zetterstedt, 1843

Subgenus Loveridgeana
Sphaerophoria beattiei (Doesburg and Doesburg, 1977) Saint Helena, South Atlantic
Sphaerophoria quadrituberculata Bezzi, 1915
Sphaerophoria retrocurva Hull, 1944

Subgenus Sphaerophoria
Sphaerophoria abbreviata Zetterstedt, 1849
Sphaerophoria assamensis Joseph, 1970
Sphaerophoria asymmetrica Knutson, 1973
Sphaerophoria bankowskae Goeldlin, 1989

Sphaerophoria batava Goeldlin, 1974
Sphaerophoria bifurcata Knutson, 1972
Sphaerophoria boreoalpina Goeldlin, 1989
Sphaerophoria brevipilosa Knutson, 1972
Sphaerophoria chongjini Bankowska, 1964
Sphaerophoria cleoae Metcalf, 1917
Sphaerophoria contigua Macquart, 1847
Sphaerophoria cranbrookensis Curran, 1921
Sphaerophoria estebani Goeldlin, 1991
Sphaerophoria fatarum Goeldlin, 1989
Sphaerophoria indiana Bigot, 1884
Sphaerophoria infuscata Goeldlin, 1974
Sphaerophoria interrupta (Fabricius, 1805)
Sphaerophoria kaa Violovitsh, 1960
Sphaerophoria laurae Goeldlin, 1989
Sphaerophoria longipilosa Knutson, 1972
Sphaerophoria macrogaster (Thomson, 1869)
Sphaerophoria menthastri (Linnaeus, 1758)
Sphaerophoria nigra Frey, 1945
Sphaerophoria novaeangliae Johnson, 1916
Sphaerophoria philanthus (Meigen, 1822)
Sphaerophoria pictipes Boheman, 1863
Sphaerophoria potentillae Claussen, 1984
Sphaerophoria pyrrhina Bigot, 1884
Sphaerophoria rueppellii (Wiedemann, 1830)
Sphaerophoria scripta (Linnaeus, 1758)
Sphaerophoria shirchan Violovitsh, 1957
Sphaerophoria sulphuripes (Thomson, 1869)
Sphaerophoria taeniata (Meigen, 1822)
Sphaerophoria turkmenica Bankowska, 1964
Sphaerophoria tuvinica Violovitsh, 1966
Sphaerophoria virgata Goeldlin, 1974
Sphaerophoria viridaenea Brunnetti, 1915
Sphaerophoria weemsi Knutson, 1972

References

Syrphini
Muscomorph flies of Europe
Diptera of North America
Diptera of Africa
Hoverfly genera
Taxa named by Amédée Louis Michel le Peletier
Taxa named by Jean Guillaume Audinet-Serville